Fathi (Arabic: فَتْحِي fat·ḥiy/ fat·ḥī/ fat·ḥy) is a given Arabic name or surname in the possessive form which means "victorious, triumphant". It may refer to:

People
Ahmad Fathi Sorour, speaker of the Egyptian People's Assembly
Ahmed Fathi (born 1984), Egyptian international football player
Albert Fathi (born 1951), Egyptian-French mathematician
Fathi Arafat (1933–2004), Palestinian physician
Fathi Eljahmi, imprisoned Libyan dissident
Fathi Hassan (born 1957), Sudanese-Egyptian video artist
Fathi Kamel (born 1955), Kuwaiti footballer
Fathi Shaqaqi (1951–1995)
Fathi Yakan, Islamic cleric

Fictional character
 Fatĥi, in Malatily Bathhouse

See also
Fathy
Fethi

Surnames
Given names
Arabic masculine given names